Chairish is a curated online marketplace for high-end vintage home furnishings. Chairish accepts furniture and decor with a minimum listing price of $25. Listing items is free, and the seller keeps up to 80 percent of the final sale.

History 
The company was founded by former fashion marketing executive Anna Brockway and travel industry executives Gregg Brockway (co-founder at Hotwire and TripIt, Andrew Denmark (co-founder at TripIt) and Eric Grosse (co-founder at Hotwire) in March 2013. According to the founders, sustainability is a top priority among most consumers, and millennials believe the resale market plays a big role in sustainability.  In 2018, the company ranked No. 388 on the Inc. 500 list of fastest growing companies. In January 2019, Chairish announced the acquisition of New York-based Dering Hall, an "online discovery platform" for contemporary furniture brands and interior designers. In 2021, the company acquired Pamono, a major European marketplace. The company was named to Newsweek’s Best Online Shops list in 2020 and 2022.

Funding 
The company raised a $3.2 million round of funding in July, 2013,  $4 million in August 2014 and $6.5 million in June 2015, primarily from O'Reilly AlphaTech Ventures (OATV) and Azure Capital Partners. In March 2017, the company announced a new round of $8.5 million led by Altos Ventures with support from return investors OATV and Azure Capital Partners. In 2020, Chairish announced a round of Series B funding of $33 million led by Austin, Texas–based firm Tritium Partners.

Technology 
On March 9, 2017, the company launched an in-app augmented reality feature, designed to allow buyers visualize items in the context of their own home. Subsequently, the Chairish app was named a 2017 Webby Honoree in the Mobile Site & Apps Category for Shopping.

References

Retail companies established in 2013
Home decor retailers
Online retailers of the United States